Jonathan Farquharson (born February 3, 1993) is a Bahamian sprinter from Grand Bahama who mainly competes in the 100m. He attended Bishop Michael Eldon School and Orlando Christian Prep before competing for the Abilene Christian Wildcats.

He won double silver in the under 17 100m and the 4 × 100 m relay at the 2009 Carifta Games in Saint Lucia. He also won gold in the 4 × 100 m relay at the 2008 Carifta Games in the Saint Kitts & Nevis. He competed at the IAAF World U18 Championships without making the final in the 100m respectively. He ran the 4 × 100 m relay at the 2015 Pan American Games in Toronto, Canada.

Personal bests

References

1993 births
Living people
People from Freeport, Bahamas
Bahamian male sprinters
Athletes (track and field) at the 2015 Pan American Games
Pan American Games competitors for the Bahamas
Abilene Christian University alumni